Waitakere Hospital is a general hospital located in the Henderson/Lincoln area of the New Zealand city of Auckland. It is administered by the Waitemata District Health Board and provides health services to approximately 560,000 residents throughout North Shore, Waitakere and Rodney districts of Auckland. It has 76 medical beds and 6 coronary care beds, a maternity unit and a surgical unit with 3 operating theatres. The hospital's Emergency Department is open to both adult and paediatric patients 24 hours a day, seven days a week.

History

In 1945 the original Waitakere Maternity Hospital was a small building in Te Atatū. The idea of a new hospital was raised that year, but it was another ten years before a site was found for the ‘North Western Hospital’. In the ensuing years a geriatric block was built and the site also became a base for community home health and support services, child disability services and for health services to school children - public health nurses, hearing and vision testing, school dental services.

HealthWest, a private primary health provider, was as of 2006 in negotiations with the hospital to be allowed to provide fee-paying patients with medical services in the hospital. While this proposed measure did not go forward as of mid-2007, it highlighted the fact that even after the NZ$60 million upgrading to general hospital status, the facility was still facing shortages, like many other public health facilities in New Zealand. In the first five months of 2008, the emergency department of the hospital was forced into partial closure 52 times, and has still not officially become a 24/7 facility. This is being blamed on short-staffing and financial constraints of the Waitematā District Health Board.

References

External links
Waitemata District Health Board (official body responsible for the hospital)
Photographs of Waitakere Hospital held in Auckland Libraries' heritage collections.

Hospitals in New Zealand
Buildings and structures in Auckland
Henderson-Massey Local Board Area
Hospitals established in 2005
2005 establishments in New Zealand
West Auckland, New Zealand